is traditional Japanese paper. The term is used to describe paper that uses local fiber, processed by hand and made in the traditional manner. Washi is made using fibers from the inner bark of the gampi tree, the mitsumata shrub (Edgeworthia chrysantha), or the paper mulberry (kōzo) bush. As a Japanese craft, it is registered as a UNESCO intangible cultural heritage.

Washi is generally tougher than ordinary paper made from wood pulp, and is used in many traditional arts. Origami, Shodō, and Ukiyo-e were all produced using washi. Washi was also used to make various everyday goods like clothes, household goods, and toys, as well as vestments and ritual objects for Shinto priests and statues of Buddha. It was even used to make wreaths that were given to winners in the 1998 Winter Paralympics. Washi is also used to repair historically valuable cultural properties, paintings, and books at museums and libraries around the world, such as the Louvre and the Vatican Museums, because of its thinness, pliability, durability over 1000 years because of its low impurities, and high workability to remove it cleanly with moisture.

Manufacture 
Washi is produced in a way similar to that of ordinary paper, but relies heavily on manual methods. It involves a long and intricate process that is often undertaken in the cold weather of winter, as pure, cold running water is essential to the production of washi. Cold inhibits bacteria, preventing the decomposition of the fibres. Cold also makes the fibres contract, producing a crisp feel to the paper. It is traditionally the winter work of farmers, a task that supplemented a farmer's income.

Paper mulberry is the most commonly used fiber in making Japanese paper.  The mulberry branches are boiled and stripped of their outer bark, and then dried. The fibers are then boiled with lye to remove the starch, fat and tannin, and then placed in running water to remove the spent lye. The fibers are then bleached (either with chemicals or naturally, by placing it in a protected area of a stream) and any remaining impurities in the fibers are picked out by hand. The product is laid on a rock or board and beaten.

Wet balls of pulp are mixed in a vat with water and a formation aid to help keep the long fibers spread evenly. This is traditionally neri, which is a mucilaginous material made from the roots of the tororo aoi plant, or PEO, polyethylene oxide. One of two traditional methods of paper making (nagashi-zuki or tame-zuki) is employed. In both methods, pulp is scooped onto a screen and shaken to spread the fibers evenly. Nagashi-zuki (which uses neri in the vat) produces a thinner paper, while tame-zuki (which does not use neri) produces a thicker paper.

History 
By the 7th century, paper had been introduced to Japan from China via the Korean Peninsula, and the Japanese developed washi by improving the method of making paper in the Heian period. The paper making technique developed in Japan around 805 to 809 was called nagashi-suki (流し漉き), a method of adding mucilage to the process of the conventional tame-suki (溜め漉き) technique to form a stronger layer of paper fibers. The improved washi came to be used to decorate religious ceremonies such as gohei, ōnusa (:ja:大麻 (神道)) , and shide at Shinto shrines, and in the Heian period, washi covered with gold and silver leaf beautifully decorated books such as Kokin Wakashu. 

In the Muromachi period, washi came to be used as ceremonial origami for samurai class at weddings and when giving gifts, and from the Sengoku period to the Edo period, recreational origami such as orizuru developed. During the Edo period, many books and ukiyo-e prints for the masses made of washi were published using woodblock printing.

Types 

With enough processing, almost any grass or tree can be made into a washi. Gampi, mitsumata, and paper mulberry are three popular sources.
  – In ancient times, it was called . Ganpishi has a smooth, shiny surface and is used for books and crafts.
  – Kōzogami is made from paper mulberry and is the most widely made type of washi. It has a toughness closer to cloth than to ordinary paper and does not weaken significantly when treated to be water-resistant.
  – Mitsumatagami has an ivory-colored, fine surface and is used for shodō as well as printing. It was used to print paper money in the Meiji period.

Applications 
Until the early 20th century, the Japanese used washi in applications where Western style paper or other materials are currently used. This is partly because washi was the only type of paper available at that time in Japan, but also because the unique characteristics of washi made it a better material. The different uses of washi include:

Art 
 Chiyogami – a method of stenciling or screenprinting paper with traditional Japanese designs
 Ikebana – the art of flower arrangement, also known as kadō
 Inkjet printings
 Kami-ito – pure-fiber washi paper spun into thread
 Katazome – a method of dyeing fabrics using a resist paste
 Kitemaking
 Mokuhanga – Japanese art of wood printing
 Nihonga – Japanese paintings
 Origami – Japanese art of paper folding
 Printmaking
 Sculpture
 Sewing
 Shibori – several methods of dyeing cloth with a pattern
 Shifu – washi that has been spun into yarn (kami-ito) and woven into cloth
 Shodo – Japanese art of calligraphy
 Sumi-e – Japanese art of Ink wash painting
 Suminagashi – Japanese art of paper marbling
 Ukiyo-e – a genre of Japanese woodblock prints
 Washi eggs – covering eggs with washi paper
 Chigiri-e – using Washi for "painting" pictures

Clothing 
 Cosplay
 Kimono
 Obi
 Zōri

Cuisine 
 Tempura

Furniture 
 Cushion
 Futon
 Shoji

Objects 
 Bags
 Bento box
 Harae-Gushi, the washi whisk used for ritual purification by Shinto priests
 Japanese banknotes
 Loudspeaker cones
 Ofuda for Shinto
 Plates
 Printing
 Scale models
 Toys
 Umbrellas
 Watch dials

Events 
 Japanese festivals
 Sumo

Weaponry 
 Fire balloons

See also 
 Genkō yōshi
 Japanese tissue
 List of Washi
 Sir Harry Parkes
 Tissue paper
 Ukiyo-e
 Rice paper
 Tropical Storm Washi

Literature

References

Weblinks 

 
 Washi 

Japanese paper
Ukiyo-e
Visual arts materials
Origami
Japanese art terminology